Yasnivka may refer to the following places in Ukraine:

Yasynivka, Donetsk Oblast
Yasynivka, Rivne Oblast